The Camarines Sur Provincial Board is the Sangguniang Panlalawigan (provincial legislature) of the Philippine province of Camarines Sur.

The members are elected via plurality-at-large voting: the province is divided into five districts, the first district sending one member, the second, third and fourth district sending two members each, and the fifth district sending three members to the provincial board; the number of candidates the electorate votes for and the number of winning candidates depends on the number of members their district sends. The vice governor is the ex officio presiding officer, and only votes to break ties. The vice governor is elected via the plurality voting system province-wide.

The districts used in appropriation of members is coextensive with the legislative districts of Camarines Sur, with the exception that Naga, an independent component city, is excluded in the third district.

Aside from the regular members, the board also includes the provincial federation presidents of the Liga ng mga Barangay (ABC, from its old name "Association of Barangay Captains"), the Sangguniang Kabataan (SK, youth councils) and the Philippine Councilors League (PCL).

Apportionment

List of members

Current members 
These are the members after the 2019 local elections and 2018 barangay and SK elections:

 Vice Governor:  (PDP–Laban)

References

Provincial boards in the Philippines
Government of Camarines Sur